Yablunovka is a rural locality (a village) in Maximovksky Selsoviet, Sterlitamaksky District, Bashkortostan, Russia. The population was 6 as of 2010. There are 2 streets.

Geography 
Yablunovka is located 65 km west of Sterlitamak (the district's administrative centre) by road. Kuganakbash is the nearest rural locality.

References 

Rural localities in Sterlitamaksky District